The VR6 engines , commonly referred to as the “staggered six” is a 6-cylinder engine configuration developed by VW . The name VR6 comes from the combination of German words “Verkürzt” and “Reihenmotor” meaning “shortened inline engine”.  It was developed specifically for transverse (Where the engine runs side-to-side while looking at an open engine bay) engine installations and FWD (Front Wheel Drive) vehicles.  The VR6 is a highly compact engine, thanks to the narrower angle of 10.5 to 15-degrees between cylinder banks, as opposed to the traditional V6 angles ranging from 45 to 90-degrees.  The compact design is cheaper to manufacture, since only one cylinder head is required for all 6 cylinders, much like a traditional inline-6 engine.

Volkswagen Group introduced the first VR6 engine in 1991 and VR6 engines currently remain in production. From 1997 to 2006, Volkswagen also produced a five-cylinder VR5 engine based on the VR6.

Description 

The name VR6 comes from the German initials for a V engine (German: V-Motor) and a straight (inline) engine (German: Reihenmotor), therefore the VR engine is described as a "Vee-Inline engine" (VR-Motor).

VR6 engines share a common cylinder head for the two banks of cylinders. Only two camshafts are needed for the engine, regardless of whether the engine has two or four valves per cylinder. This simplifies engine construction and reduces costs.

Since the cylinders are not located on the centreline of the combined cylinder head, the lengths of the intake and exhaust ports are different for each bank. Without compensation, these varying port lengths would result in the two banks of cylinders producing different amounts of power at a particular engine RPM. The difference in port lengths are compensated for with the length of the runners in the intake manifold, the camshaft overlap and lift profile, or a combination thereof.

Volkswagen engines 

The Volkswagen VR6 engine was designed for transverse engine installations in front-wheel drive vehicles. The narrow angle of 15° between the two cylinder banks reduced the width of the engine, compared to a traditional V6 engine. Therefore, the VR6 engine is easier to fit within an engine bay that was originally designed for a four-cylinder engine.

12-valve versions 
Early VR6 engines had two valves per cylinder (for a total of twelve valves) and used one camshaft for the intake and exhaust valves of each cylinder bank (without the use of rockers).

The first Volkswagen VR6 engine uses the AAA version.

The V angle between the cylinder banks is 15°, and the compression ratio is 10:1. The crankshaft runs in seven main bearings and the journals are offset 22° to one another, in order to accommodate the offset cylinder placement. This also allows the use of a 120° firing interval between cylinders. The firing order is:  1, 5, 3, 6, 2, 4.

Since the two 'rows' of pistons and cylinders share a single cylinder head and head gasket, the piston crown (or top surface) is tilted. The engine management system is Bosch Motronic.

24-valve versions 
A version with four valves per cylinder (for a total of 24 valves) was introduced in 1999. The 24-valve versions use one camshaft for the intake valves of both banks (using rockers to reach the furthest bank) and the other camshaft for the exhaust valves of both banks (again, through the use of rockers). This operating principle is more akin to a double overhead camshaft (DOHC) design, with one camshaft for intake valves, and one for exhaust valves.

History 
The 1922-1976 Lancia V4 engine was the first narrow angle V engine to be used in a motor vehicle.

The first versions of the VR6 engine were introduced in the 1991 Volkswagen Passat B3 sedan and Volkswagen Corrado coupe. A  AAA version producing  was used in most Passat models and in the North American version of the Corrado. A  ABV version producing  was used in the Passat Syncro model and the European version of the Corrado. Both versions used 2 valves per cylinder. Usage of the VR6 engine spread to the Volkswagen Golf Mk3 2.8 VR6 and Volkswagen Vento/Jetta (A3) 2.8 VR6 models in 1992. The 2.8 litre version was also used in the 1996-2003 Mercedes-Benz Vito (W638) commercial vans, where it was designated as 'M104.900'.

In 1997, the VR5 engine was introduced, based on the VR6 engine.

An AQP/AUE version with 4 valves per cylinder was introduced in 2000. This  engine produced , and mostly replaced the 2 valve engines, except for in North America where an updated version of the 2 valve engine was used in the Golf and Jetta from 2000 to 2002.

A  EA390 version of the 4 valve engine was introduced in the 2001 Volkswagen New Beetle RSi model. Versions of this 3.2 litre engine was also used in the 2002-2004 Volkswagen Golf Mk4 R32 model and the 2003-2010 Audi TT 3.2 VR6 quattro models.

The engine size was again increased in 2005, when a  version with gasoline direct injection (FSI) was introduced in the Volkswagen Passat (B6). This BLV version uses a narrower 10.6 degree angle between the cylinder banks and produces . A  AXZ version producing  was introduced in 2006. In 2008, an uprated BWS version of the 3.6 litre engine producing  was introduced in the Volkswagen Passat (B6) R36 model.

The base model Porsche Cayenne (9PA) used 3.2-liter VR6 engine from 2003 to 2006 and then a 3.6-litre VR6 engine from 2008 to 2010. Then the next generation Porsche Cayenne (92A) also used a 3.6-litre VR6 engine from 2010 to 2018.

Volkswagen had started to phase out VR engines in favour of downsized turbocharged engines. In 2017, the VR6 engines made an unexpected comeback, with versions of the 24-valve VR6 engines being produced for the Volkswagen Atlas. Volkswagen also made brand new VR6 (still EA390) for Chinese market only, its 2,5Litre Turbocharged 24v VR6  and 500 nm of torque for Volkswagen Teramont SUV and new Volkswagen Talagon MPV

Applications

Volkswagen Group automobiles:

 1991-1995 Volkswagen Corrado
 1991-2015 Volkswagen Passat B3, B4, B6 and B7 generations
 1992-1998 Volkswagen Golf Mk3
 1992-1999 Volkswagen Vento/Volkswagen Jetta Mk3
 1995-2000 Volkswagen Sharan
 1996-2003 Volkswagen Transporter (T4)
 1996-2010 SEAT Alhambra (7M)
 1998-2003 Volkswagen Golf Mk4
 1999-2005 Volkswagen Bora/Volkswagen Jetta Mk4
 2000-2004 SEAT León (1M)
 2001-2003 Volkswagen New Beetle RSi
 2002-2016 Volkswagen Phaeton
 2002-2018 Volkswagen Touareg
 2002-2018 Porsche Cayenne E1 and E2 generations
 2003-2009 Volkswagen Transporter (T5)
 2003-2013 Audi A3 (8P)
 2003-2010 Audi TT Mk1 and Mk2
 2005-2008 Volkswagen Golf Mk5 R32
 2006-2011 Volkswagen Eos
 2008-2017 Volkswagen CC
 2008-2010 Škoda Superb (3T)
 2008-2015 Audi Q7 (4L)
 2011-2018 Volkswagen Passat NMS
 2017–present Volkswagen Atlas/Teramont
 2021–present Volkswagen Talagon
 2022–present Audi Q6

Other manufacturers:

 1995-2000 Ford Galaxy Mk I
 1996-2003 Mercedes-Benz Vito (W638)
 1997-2005 Winnebago Rialta/Vista/Itasca Sunstar
 2006- Yes! 2
 2009-2012 Artega GT
 Linde Forklifts (fuelled by Liquefied petroleum gas)

W engines 

Volkswagen Group has produced several 'W engines' based on combining two VR engines on a common crankshaft. The first W engine to reach production was the W12 engine which has been produced since 2001. The W12 engine is constructed from two VR6 engines mated together at an angle of 72 degrees. Although Volkswagen has not produced a VR4 engine, nonetheless it briefly produced a W8 engine from 2001 to 2004.

The largest Volkswagen W engine is the W16 engine introduced on the Bugatti Veyron in 2005. This engine uses an angle of 90 degrees between the two VR8 engines, and has four turbochargers.

Other manufacturers 
Motorcycle manufacturer Horex has produced VR6 engines since 2012.

References

Volkswagen Group engines
Piston engine configurations
V6 engines
Gasoline engines by model
1991 introductions
V engines